WNSX (97.7 MHz Star 97.7) is a commercial FM radio station broadcasting a classic hits radio format. The station signed on in 1999 as WNSX. Licensed to Winter Harbor, Maine, the station's studios and offices are on Maine State Route 3 (High Street) in Ellsworth.  It serves Downeast Maine, including Ellsworth, Bar Harbor, Bucksport, and Machias.

WNSX is owned by Stony Creek Broadcasting, LLC. WNSX's music includes the 1970s, 80s and 90s Top 40 hits of classic rock artists such as The Eagles, Fleetwood Mac, Billy Joel and Elton John, but avoids pop and dance artists such as Michael Jackson, Prince, and Madonna.  The station uses the slogan "Smooth Rock 'n' Roll" to indicate it does not play rock songs that are too hard-edged.

WNSX's transmitter is off Tunk Lake Road in Sullivan.  The station's primary signal serves Hancock and Washington Counties.  Its main competitors are classic rock 95.7 WWMJ Ellsworth and classic hits 107.7 WBKA in Bar Harbor.

History
  Maine businessman Scott Hogg was granted a construction permit from the Federal Communications Commission to build a new FM station at 97.7 in the mid-1990s.  It used the call sign WAKN before making it to the air.

The station signed on in 1999 as WNSX.  It originally simulcast its then-sister station WMDI (now WBKA).

In 2001, the station was purchased by Clear Channel Communications for $1.1 million.  It began simulcasting the classic rock format of its sister station 101.7 WFZX. WNSX later flipped to a sports radio format, carrying Fox Sports Radio for several years before returning to a simulcast of WFZX.

In 2005, the station was sold to Stony Creek Broadcasting, with Mark L. Osborne as managing member.  The cost was $800,000.  WNSX then switched to its current format of classic hits.

References

External links

NSX
Classic hits radio stations in the United States
Winter Harbor, Maine
Radio stations established in 1999
1999 establishments in Maine